Support Lesbiens is a Czech musical group from Prague. It was founded in 1992. Their single "Cliché" was the first single by a Czech English-singing group to reach number one in an official radio chart IFPI. The band is considered to be a part of the New Age genre, though it carries many Rock features as well. After the release of a new single "Changes" (in May 2013) with the new band members, the band is currently working on new album that should be ready in autumn 2013.

Musical career
Support Lesbiens experienced a tough start in the Czech musical scene due to a general skepticism against Czech bands singing in English. Their first two albums were known by only the most die-hard Czech fans, but their break came with the album Regeneration?, which jump-started their rise to domestic fame. 

After their fourth album Tune Da Radio, the band's lead guitarist and writer Jaromír Helešic left the band, leading to a slight turn away from the Rock genre to a more modern style.

In May 2013, the group announced a new, as yet unnamed album, due to be released in autumn 2013.

In May, 2013, the band released a brand new single.

Band members
Current members

Josef Czenda Urbánek - vocals
Hynek Toman - guitar
Jan Andr - keyboards
Filip Fendrych - bass
Radek Tomášek - drums

Past members 

 Kryštof Michal - vocals

Discography 
 So, What? (1993)
 Medicine Man (1994)
 Regeneration? (2001)
 Tune Da Radio (2002)
 Midlife (2004)
 Euphony and Other Adventures (2006)
 Greatest Hits 1993-2007 (2007)
 Lick It (2008)
 Soft Collection (2009)
 Homobot (2011)
 Changes (2013) - new band members
 K.I.D. (2015)
 Glow (2018)

References

External links 
 
 Kapela Support Lesbiens přežila svůj rozpad: Je zpátky v nové sestavě! - AHA.cz
 Support Lesbiens bez Kryštofa Michala přitvrdí. Deska bude v listopadu
 Support Lesbiens jsou zpět a vyrážejí na turné!
 Nová deska, nová sestava - staří dobří Supporti?
 Support Lesbiens bez Kryštofa Michala přitvrdí. Deska bude v listopadu

Musical groups established in 1992
Czech rock music groups
1992 establishments in Czechoslovakia